Carolina style refers to an established set of condiments for hot dogs and hamburgers, originating in the Coastal Plain and Piedmont regions of North Carolina and South Carolina. The classic combination is chili, slaw and onions; locally, mustard sometimes replaces slaw, or is added as a fourth item.

The designation "Carolina style" has become increasingly recognized outside of the Carolinas; for example, the restaurant chain Wendy's has from time to time offered a "Carolina Classic" option on its hamburger menu.

References

Further reading
 "A Pan-American Hot Dog Wonderland". Chow.

North Carolina cuisine
Hot dogs
American condiments